This list of train routes in the Netherlands focuses on the routes taken by trains travelling on railway lines in the Netherlands. A list including all stops on the train routes can be found at Dutch railway services.

Train number series
Below are the train routes in the Netherlands (in 2011) with the number of the train series. It is typically a multiple of 100, while the train numbers add a number in the range 1 through 99 to it (where odd numbers are for trains in one direction, and even numbers for trains in the opposite direction, except for some international services). These numbers should not be confused with the numbers of locomotives, rail cars or train-sets, or with the table numbers of railway lines in the Spoorboekje.

Abbreviations:
ICE: Intercity Express, THA: Thalys, CNL: CityNightLine

For details of these types of train service, and for listings of more stations on the routes, see Dutch railway services.

Train routes with reversal of direction

Train routes with reversal of direction on the way (all with multiple units or push-pull trains), with station:

3000, 3100 Arnhem
500, 1700, 2000, 2800, 11700 Utrecht

See also

Railway stations in the Netherlands
Betuweroute–freight line connecting Rotterdam with the German Ruhr area.

External links
ProRail railway map
http://kubus.mailspool.nl/spoorkaart–Shows details and map of train route for a given train series number or train number, with the option to show live the locations of moving passenger trains.
http://www.sporenplan.nl/html_nl/sporenplan/ns/ns_normaal/start.html–Schematic maps of all tracks, switches and platforms.
Overview of service disruptions